Martin Valchinov (Bulgarian: Мартин Вълчинов; born 10 November 1999) is a Bulgarian footballer who plays as a winger for Litex. He is a son of the Bulgarian retired footballer and now manager Yavor Valchinov.

Career

Lokomotiv Sofia
In the end of 2016 Valchinov moved from Levski Sofia youths to Lokomotiv Sofia main team. He made his debut for the team on 14 April 2017 in a league match against Botev Galabovo.

Septemvri Sofia
In the summer of 2017 he moved to Septemvri Sofia. Martin completed his professional debut for the club in a league match against Lokomotiv Plovdiv.

Litex Lovech
In June 2022, Valchinov joined Litex.

Honours

Club
Balkan Botevgrad
 Cup of Bulgarian Amateur Football League: 2019

Career statistics

Club

References

External links
 

1999 births
Living people
Bulgarian footballers
Bulgaria youth international footballers
Association football midfielders
FC Septemvri Sofia players
FC Hebar Pazardzhik players
First Professional Football League (Bulgaria) players